Malibcong, officially the Municipality of Malibcong, is a 5th class municipality in the province of Abra, Philippines. According to the 2020 census, it has a population of 4,027 people.

Geography

According to the Philippine Statistics Authority, the municipality has a land area of  constituting  of the  total area of Abra.

Barangays
Malibcong is politically subdivided into 12 barangays. These barangays are headed by elected officials: Barangay Captain, Barangay Council, whose members are called Barangay Councilors. All are elected every three years.

Climate

Demographics

In the 2020 census, Malibcong had a population of 4,027.

The Itneg tribe can be found in Malibcong and they speak a sub-dialect of Banao Itneg language, and Ilocano. There are three dialects in malibcong: Banao, Gubang and Mabaka.

Economy

Government
Malibcong, belonging to the lone congressional district of the province of Abra, is governed by a mayor designated as its local chief executive and by a municipal council as its legislative body in accordance with the Local Government Code. The mayor, vice mayor, and the councilors are elected directly by the people through an election which is being held every three years.

Elected officials

References

External links

 [ Philippine Standard Geographic Code]

Municipalities of Abra (province)